The 2019 Virginia Senate election was held on November 5, 2019, concurrently with the House election, to elect members to all 40 seats in the Senate of Virginia for the 161st Virginia General Assembly and the 162nd Virginia General Assembly. Primaries were held on June 11. The elections resulted in Democrats gaining 2 seats in the senate, and gaining control of both chambers of the General Assembly, marking the first time that Democrats held control of both legislative and executive branches in Virginia since 1993.

Overall results

Close races 
Seats where the margin of victory was under 10%:

Summary of results

Retiring incumbents
Three incumbent Senators, all Republicans, decided not to seek reelection:

Frank Wagner (R), District 7 (Subsequently resigned in May 2019)
Dick Black (R), District 13
Charles William Carrico Sr. (R), District 40

Incumbents defeated

In primary election
One incumbent senator, a Democrat, was defeated in the June 11 primary election.

Rosalyn Dance (D), District 16

In general election
One incumbent senator, a Republican, was defeated in the November 5th general election.
 Glen Sturtevant, District 10

Detailed results

Uncontested primaries are not reported by the Virginia Department of Elections.

District 1
Incumbent Democrat Monty Mason has represented the 1st District since 2017.

General election

District 2
Incumbent Democrat Mamie Locke has represented the 2nd district since 2004.

General election

District 3
Incumbent Republican and current Majority Leader Tommy Norment has represented the 3rd district since 1992.

General election

District 4
Incumbent Republican Ryan McDougle has represented the 4th district since 2006.

General election

District 5
Incumbent Democrat Lionell Spruill has represented the 5th district since 2017.

General election

District 6
Incumbent Democrat Lynwood Lewis has represented the 6th district since a 2014 special election.

Democratic primary

General election

District 7
The seat has been vacant since May 2019 when incumbent Republican Frank Wagner (who had already announced his intention not to seek reelection) resigned to take the position as deputy director of the Virginia Lottery.

Republican primary

Democratic primary

General election

District 8
Incumbent Republican Bill DeSteph has represented the 8th district since 2016.

General election

District 9
Incumbent Democrat Jennifer McClellan has represented the 9th district since a 2017 special election.

General election

District 10
Incumbent Republican Glen Sturtevant has represented the 10th district since 2016.

Democratic primary

General election

District 11
Incumbent Republican Amanda Chase has represented the 11th district since 2016.

Democratic primary

General election

District 12
Incumbent Republican Siobhan Dunnavant has represented the 12th district since 2016.

Democratic primary

General election

District 13
Incumbent Republican Dick Black has represented the 13th district since 2012. He is not running for reelection.

Republican primary

General election

District 14
Incumbent Republican John Cosgrove has represented the 14th district since a 2013 special election.

General election

District 15
Incumbent Republican Frank Ruff has represented the 15th district since a 2000 special election.

Republican primary

General election

District 16
Incumbent Democrat Rosalyn Dance has represented the 16th district since a 2014 special election. She was defeated in the June 11 primary election.

Democratic primary

General election

District 17
Incumbent Republican Bryce Reeves has represented the 17th district since 2012.

Republican primary

Democratic primary

General election

District 18
Incumbent Democrat Louise Lucas has represented the 18th district since 1992.

General election

District 19
Incumbent Republican David Suetterlein has represented the 19th district since 2016.

General election

District 20
Incumbent Republican Bill Stanley has represented the 20th district since 2012.

General election

District 21
Incumbent Democrat John S. Edwards has represented the 21st district since 1996.

General election

District 22
Incumbent Republican Mark Peake has represented the 22nd district since a 2017 special election.

General election

District 23
Incumbent Republican Stephen Newman has represented the 23rd district since 1996.

General election

District 24
Incumbent Republican Emmett Hanger has represented the 24th district since 1996.

Republican primary

General election

District 25
Incumbent Democrat Creigh Deeds has represented the 25th district since a 2001 special election.

General election

District 26
Incumbent Republican Mark Obenshain has represented the 26th district since a 2004 special election.

General election

District 27
Incumbent Republican Jill Vogel has represented the 27th district since 2008.

General election

District 28
Incumbent Republican Richard Stuart has represented the 28th district since 2008.

Democratic primary

General election

District 29
Incumbent Democrat Jeremy McPike has represented the 29th district since 2016.

General election

District 30
Incumbent Democrat Adam Ebbin has represented the 30th district since 2012.

General election

District 31
Incumbent Democrat Barbara Favola has represented the 31st district since 2012.

Democratic primary

General election

District 32
Incumbent Democrat Janet Howell has represented the 32nd district since 1992.

General election

District 33
Incumbent Democrat Jennifer Boysko has represented the 33rd district since a 2019 special election.

Democratic primary

General election

District 34
Incumbent Democrat Chap Petersen has represented the 34th district since 2008.

General election

District 35
Incumbent Democrat and current Minority Leader Dick Saslaw has represented the 35th district since 1980.

Democratic primary

General election

District 36
Incumbent Democrat Scott Surovell has represented the 36th district since 2016.

General election

District 37
Incumbent Democrat Dave Marsden has represented the 37th district since a 2010 special election.

General election

District 38
Incumbent Republican Ben Chafin has represented the 38th district since a 2014 special election.

General election

District 39
Incumbent Democrat George Barker has represented the 39th district since 2008.

General election

District 40
Incumbent Republican Charles William Carrico Sr. has represented the 40th district since 2012. He did not run for reelection.

General election

Polling

See also
2019 Virginia House of Delegates election
2019 Virginia elections

Notes

External links
Official results

References

2019 Virginia elections
Virginia Senate elections
Virginia, Senate
November 2019 events in the United States